PhotoImpression is an image manager by ArcSoft for Mac OS X and Windows. It is often bundled with Epson all-in-one printers. The program's interface on Mac OS X looks exactly like a Windows program.

Versions
 PhotoImpression 1
 PhotoImpression 2000
 PhotoImpression 3
 PhotoImpression 4
 PhotoImpression 5
 PhotoImpression 6

PhotoImpression 4
PhotoImpression 4 is computer software by ArcSoft Corporation, running on Mac OS 9 and Windows. It was bundled with Creative Webcams, particularly their 'NX Pro' (CNET ad) and 'Webcam Notebook' (CNET ad) models, on CD, compatible with Windows 98SE, ME, 2000, and XP Operating Systems.

Features

PhotoImpression 4 sports five main features, each consisting of a few sub-features:

 Get Photo: this is the section in which one would obtain photos/images. A user may obtain an image from a sample folder (supplied with the software), from a folder such as My Pictures, from a camera/scanner that is connected to your Mac/PC, from a screen capture, which captures the exact image from his/her monitor, or simply create his/her own.
 Edit: In this section, one may edit the image obtained through the Get Photo section, in ways such as cropping, adding text, adjusting layering, "enhancing", "retouching", or adding "effects," such as a 3-D grid or reversing the colors.
 Create: In this section, one may create a border or calendar, etc.
 Save: In this self-explanatory section, one may save an edited image to the desktop, email the image, or simply save into a folder.
 Print: In yet another self-explanatory section, this section allows one to adjust the printer settings, such as orientation of the print on the paper or the size of the print on the paper. One may also arrange multiple images onto one sheet of paper, as to save paper.

This version of the PhotoImpression software was not compatible (could not save in) the GIF format, but did save in most other graphics formats (JPG, PNG, BMP).

It also featured simple versions of advanced image editing features such as layers, paintbrush cloning, color picking, and 'magic' select (which allowed users to add to selected areas in multiple clicks).

Macintosh graphics software
MacOS graphics software
Windows graphics-related software